The Archdeacon of Loughborough is a senior ecclesiastical officer within the Diocese of Leicester. The archdeaconry was created within the Diocese of Peterborough and from the Archdeaconry of Leicester on 25 February 1921 but became part of the new Diocese of Leicester upon its creation on 12 November 1926.

The Archdeacon is responsible for the disciplinary supervision of the clergy within the area deaneries: Akeley East, Akeley South, Akeley West, Guthlaxton, Sparkenhoe East and Sparkenhoe West.

Claire Wood became the Archdeacon of Loughborough on 8 October 2017.

List of archdeacons
 1921–1921 (res.): Charles Boucher
 1921–15 November 1922 (d.): Percy Bowers
 1923–1940 (ret.): William Hurrell (afterwards archdeacon emeritus)
 1940–1953 (ret.): William Lyon (afterwards archdeacon emeritus)
 1953–1963 (res.): Berkeley Cole
 1963–1986 (ret.): Harold Lockley (afterwards archdeacon emeritus)
 1986–1992 (ret.): Hughie Jones (afterwards archdeacon emeritus)
 1992–2005 (ret.): Ian Stanes (afterwards archdeacon emeritus)
 2005–2009 (res.): Paul Hackwood
 200927 March 2017 (ret.): David Newman
 28 February8 October 2017: Sue Field, acting archdeacon and Diocesan Director of Ordinands
 8 October 2017present: Claire Wood

References

Anglican ecclesiastical offices
Lists of Anglicans
Lists of English people
Diocese of Leicester